Paulina Matysiak (born 2 October 1984) is a Polish local government official and political activist, serving on the national board of the democratic socialist Lewica Razem party and member of the 9th term Sejm.

Biography
She completed her MA in Polish philology at the Nicolaus Copernicus University in Toruń (2008), then her post-graduate studies in 20th century philosophy at Collegium Civitas in Warsaw (2011) and ethics at the Nicolaus Copernicus University (2015).

She runs a blog dedicated to literature, Zaginam Rogi (I fold corners), became a writer for the Wszystko Co Najważniejsze magazine, and co-authored several scientific publications, reviews, and bibliographic studies. She is a member of the Association of Polish Librarians.

Politics
In March 2019, she became a member of the national board of Lewica Razem. In the 2019 parliamentary election, she was elected to the 9th term Sejm. She was the leading candidate on the Democratic Left Alliance list in district 11 (Sieradz). Her focus is on improving healthcare standards, wealth redistribution, gender equality and public transport.

References

1984 births
Living people
Left Together politicians
Polish socialist feminists
Nicolaus Copernicus University in Toruń alumni
Women members of the Sejm of the Republic of Poland
21st-century Polish women politicians
People from Kutno